Frank Stuart Hall (August 17, 1853 – September 5, 1928) was an American farmer and politician from New York.

Life 
Hall was born on August 17, 1853 in Lima, New York, the son of fruit-grower and postmaster James Henry Hall and Jane Fitch Clark. His great-grandfather was General Amos Hall, a veteran of the American Revolutionary War and the War of 1812 who served as United States Marshal and in the New York State Assembly and New York State Senate.

Hall moved to Livingston County with his parents when he was two. He attended the district schools and a West Bloomfield school. After his father died in 1864, he helped support his mother and younger brother F. C. Hall. He went to the Genesee Wesleyan Seminary in Lima for three winters. In the summer of 1879, he clerked in his brother's store in Hornell. In the fall of that year, he moved to Webster County, Nebraska and worked in the sheep raising business. He moved back to New York in 1888 due to his mother's poor health, living with her in West Bloomfield. A year later, he moved to Lewiston with his family and worked in the farming and fruit business.

Hall served as town assessor for fourteen consecutive years. In 1921, he was elected to the New York State Assembly as a Republican, representing the Niagara County 2nd District. He served in the Assembly in 1922, 1923, 1924, 1925, 1926, 1927, and 1928. He was a member of the Buffalo and Niagara Frontier port authority survey commission until it was abolished in 1927.

Hall was a member of the State Grange. He was senior elder of the Presbyterian Church in Lewiston. In 1884, he married Adelaide E. Magee of Nebraska. They adopted Adelaide's niece, Helen Magee Hall.

Hall died at home on September 5, 1928. He was seeking renomination to the Assembly when he died. He was buried in West Bloomfield.

References

External links 
 The Political Graveyard
 Frank S. Hall at Find a Grave

1853 births
1928 deaths
People from Lima, New York
Genesee Wesleyan Seminary alumni
People from Webster County, Nebraska
Politicians from Niagara County, New York
People from Lewiston, New York
Farmers from New York (state)
20th-century American politicians
Republican Party members of the New York State Assembly
Presbyterians from New York (state)
Burials in New York (state)